Phenolia is a genus of sap-feeding beetles in the family Nitidulidae. There are about nine described species in Phenolia.

Species
These nine species belong to the genus Phenolia:
 Phenolia amplificator Hisamatsu, 1956
 Phenolia angustitibialis Kirejtshuk & Kurochkin, 2010
 Phenolia attenuata (Reitter, 1879)
 Phenolia caucasicus (Kirejtshuk, 1990)
 Phenolia costipennis (Boheman, 1851)
 Phenolia grossa (Fabricius, 1801)
 Phenolia limbata (Fabricius, 1781)
 Phenolia oviformis Kirejtshuk, 2002
 Phenolia robusta Kirejtshuk, 2002

References

Further reading

External links

 

Nitidulidae
Articles created by Qbugbot